Liberty Bus Incorporated was a school bus manufacturer based in Lima, Ohio.

The company was founded in the 1990s and ceased operations in March 2005.

Products 

Liberty Bus built mini school buses using GMC or Chevrolet van chassis:

 Body on GMC C5000/Revolution - midsize school bus
 Body on GMC Express/MPB - mini school bus
 Body on Chevrolet Express chassis/Freedom - mini school bus
 Body on Chevrolet Express chassis/Independence - mini school bus

References

External links 

School bus manufacturers
Bus manufacturers of the United States
Companies based in Ohio
Lima, Ohio